Janseola titaea is a moth in the family Heterogynidae. It was described by Herbert Druce in 1896.

References

Heterogynidae
Moths described in 1896